Mohamed Atef Anwar Sadat (13 March 1948 – 6 October 1973) was a fighter pilot in the Egyptian Air Force who had the rank of flight lieutenant. In the Yom Kippur War, he and colleagues were killed in a raid on an Israeli military airport. He is the younger stepbrother of former Egyptian President Anwar Sadat, who was assassinated on the same day eight years later.

Early life
Atef Sadat was born on 13 March 1948 in the village of Mit Abu El Kom, Tala District, in Monufia Governorate. He graduated from the Egyptian Air Academy in 1966, and spent two years in the Soviet Union, attending a training program on air fighters and then fighter bombers (the Sukhoi).

Yom Kippur War
On 5 October 1973, a state of readiness was launched at Bilbeis Airport, and every pilot ran a fighter inside the fortified aircraft complex, and the planes were armed with bombs and ready, but the mission was cancelled as this was a training exercise on assembling pilots.

During the First Egyptian Air Strike, Atef Sadat was part of Sukhois formation that attacked the Israeli Meliz airfield. during the attack, Atef's plane was shot down and he was killed.

Reports of his death
To avoid distracting her husband, Jehan Sadat waited until the eighth day of the war before breaking the news of his stepbrother's death to him. He was first reported dead on 5 January 1974 by Egyptian newspapers. On 31 March 1974, an Israeli army spokesman disclosed that a search party had found his body in the sands of the western Sinai Peninsula and that it had handed him over to the Egyptian government. He was buried the same day in his hometown of Mit Abu El Kom.

Honors
Order of the Sinai Star : When the celebration was held to honor the heroes of October in the People's Assembly, Anwar Sadat received the Order of the Sinai Star in honor of his stepbrother's name, and the Minister of War, Ahmad Ismail Ali, handed him the medal.

References

Egyptian Air Force personnel
1948 births
1973 deaths
Recipients of the Order of the Sinai Star
People from Monufia Governorate
Sadat family
Egyptian Air Academy alumni
Yom Kippur War pilots
Egyptian military casualties of the Yom Kippur War
Egyptian military personnel killed in action